Goshen Township is one of the fourteen townships of Mahoning County, Ohio, United States. The 2010 census recorded 3,243 people in the township.

Geography
Located in the southwestern part of the county, it borders the following townships:
Ellsworth Township - northeast
Green Township - east
Perry Township, Columbiana County - southeast
Butler Township, Columbiana County - south
Knox Township, Columbiana County - southwest corner
Smith Township - west
Berlin Township - northwest

No municipalities are located in Goshen Township, although the unincorporated community of Damascus lies in the southwestern part of the township.

Name and history
Named after Goshen, Connecticut, is one of seven Goshen Townships statewide.

Goshen Township was established in 1810. For many years, the township was part of Columbiana County, before becoming part of Mahoning County in 1846.

Government
The township is governed by a three-member board of trustees, who are elected in November of odd-numbered years to a four-year term beginning on the following January 1. Two are elected in the year after the presidential election and one is elected in the year before it. There is also an elected township fiscal officer, who serves a four-year term beginning on April 1 of the year after the election, which is held in November of the year before the presidential election. Vacancies in the fiscal officership or on the board of trustees are filled by the remaining trustees.

References

External links
Township website
County website

Townships in Mahoning County, Ohio
1810 establishments in Ohio
Populated places established in 1810
Townships in Ohio